Kittler is a surname. Notable people with the surname include:

Friedrich Kittler (1943–2011), German literary scholar and media theorist
 (1861–1944), German sculptor
Régis Kittler (born 1979), French footballer

See also
Kistler (surname)